Wu Weiye (1609–1671) was a Chinese poet and politician. He was a poet in Classical Chinese poetry. He lived during the difficult times of the Ming-Qing transition. Along with Gong Dingzi and Qian Qianyi, Wu Weiye was famous as one of the Three Masters of Jiangdong. Wu Weiye was known for writing in the ci (song lyric) poetry form as well as writing about current events in both the regular ci and the seven-syllable long form, the gexing.

Notes

References
Zhang, Hongsheng (2002). "Gong Dingzi and the Courtesan Gu Mei:  Their Romance and the Revival of the Song Lyric in the Ming-Qing Transition", in Hsiang Lectures on Chinese Poetry, Volume 2, Grace S. Fong, editor. (Montreal: Center for East Asian Research, McGill University).

1609 births
1671 deaths
17th-century Chinese poets
Ming dynasty poets
Qing dynasty poets
Qing dynasty politicians from Jiangsu
Poets from Jiangsu
Politicians from Suzhou
Writers from Suzhou